The Newham Recorder is a local weekly newspaper distributed in the London Borough of Newham. It is published weekly, on a Wednesday, in the tabloid format by Archant, the UK's largest independently owned regional media business, with a digital edition updated throughout the day.

History
The newspaper was founded in 1968, three years after the county boroughs of West Ham and East Ham - both of which had previously been part of Essex - were combined to form the new London Borough of Newham. Prior to that, since the early 1900s the area had been served by the East Ham Recorder, a slip edition of the Ilford Recorder.

The Recorder won the title of National Campaigning Newspaper of the year in 1995.

The Newham Recorders Susan Smith won Feature Writer of the Year at the Eastern Counties Newspaper Group awards in 2007.
The Newham title also won the Q Cup, awarded by Archant to its Community Newspaper of the Year in 2009.

Archant withdrew the Newham Recorder, along with several other newspapers in its stable, from the ABC circulation figures in 2010 because it felt they didn't properly reflect its size in view of the variety of distribution channels used, with only part being paid for.

The newspaper received praise from the police for its coverage of the rioting and criminal disorder of August 2011.

Editorial history
The newspaper has had only five editors.  The first, Tom Duncan, was made a freeman of Newham in recognition of his work in the community.  The second, from 1997, was Colin Grainger who joined as a trainee reporter upon leaving a local school in 1972.  Grainger left in November 2012 after Archant merged the Recorders news team with that of the Docklands & East London Advertiser.  Both weeklies were then controlled by one single editor, Archant's East London Group Editor Malcolm Starbrook. The two papers were "un-merged" in 2014 and the Newham Recorder acquired a new editor, Michael Adkins.
In 2017 Lorraine King became the paper's new editor after Adkins was promoted to Archant's Group Editor for London.

References

London newspapers
Media and communications in the London Borough of Newham
Weekly newspapers published in the United Kingdom
Publications established in 1968
1968 establishments in England